Oscar Diaz (September 29, 1982 – February 26, 2015) was an American professional boxer and a NABF welterweight titleholder.

Professional career
Díaz made his professional debut on March 16, 2001, and in 2004 suffered his first defeat to Ebo Elder.

On July 16, 2008, Diaz took on Delvin Rodriguez on ESPN2. Diaz took serious punishment throughout the fight and was unable to continue in the 11th round of the fight. He then collapsed in the ring.  Diaz underwent surgery to reduce the swelling on his brain, and subsequently went into a coma.

Later life
Diaz awoke from his coma after two months in September 2008, and was reportedly breathing on his own and in stable condition. According to the San Antonio Express-News, Diaz was discharged from University Hospital in San Antonio and moved to a local rehabilitation facility. Diaz died on February 26, 2015, aged 32, in his home town of San Antonio, Texas.

Reaction to his death
Delvin Rodriguez commented live on ESPN2 about Diaz's death that "If I could go back in time, this fight would have never happened....Oscar, rest in peace".

External links

References

1982 births
American boxers of Mexican descent
2015 deaths
American male boxers
People with disorders of consciousness
People with traumatic brain injuries
People with severe brain damage
Welterweight boxers